Stigmella unifasciella is a moth of the family Nepticulidae. It is found in the United States in Kentucky, Ohio, Maryland, Illinois, Texas and Massachusetts.

The wingspan is 4.5-7.4 mm. There are possibly two generations per year. Adults have been collected in mid-June in Ohio and in late July on Plummers Island in Maryland.

The host plant is unknown, but might be a Quercus species.

External links
Nepticulidae of North America
A taxonomic revision of the North American species of Stigmella (Lepidoptera: Nepticulidae)

Nepticulidae
Moths of North America
Moths described in 1875